Polona Zupan (born 9 March 1976) is a Slovenian snowboarder. She competed in the women's giant slalom event at the 1998 Winter Olympics.

References

1976 births
Living people
Slovenian female snowboarders
Olympic snowboarders of Slovenia
Snowboarders at the 1998 Winter Olympics
People from the Municipality of Naklo